Steer(s) or steering may refer to:

Animals 
 Steer (cattle) or bullock, castrated male cattle
 Ox, a bovine (usually a steer) used as a draft animal

People 

 Steer (surname)
 Steers (surname)

Places 
 Steer Creek (West Virginia), a tributary of the Little Kanawha River in central West Virginia in the United States
 Steer Island, a former bar island in Summers County, West Virginia
 Steer Stadium, a baseball park located in Graham, Texas

Other uses 
 Steering, mechanism used to turn a vehicle
 "Steer" (song), a 2007 song by Missy Higgins
 Steers, South African fast food chain
 STEER, a variant of PEST, a technique used in business analysis

See also 
 Steers (disambiguation)
Steerage (disambiguation)